Arkadu Parthasarathy Komala (born 28 August 1934), commonly known as A. P. Komala, is an Indian playback singer. She has sung songs in Tamil, Malayalam, Telugu and Kannada languages.

Career life
She was a much sought after playback singer from the late 1940s till the mid 1960s in Tamil, Malayalam, Telugu and Kannada movies. She continued in Malayalam till the early 1970s whereas she recorded very few songs in Tamil and Telugu during the 1960s.

Music composers she sang for
She worked under G. Ramanathan, K. V. Mahadevan, C. R. Subburaman, S. V. Venkatraman, Viswanathan–Ramamoorthy, T. A. Kalyanam, M. S. Gnanamani, M. S. Viswanathan, C. S. Jayaraman, S. M. Subbaiah Naidu, T. R. Pappa, Vedha, M. K. Athmanathan, A. V. Natarajan, C. N. Pandurangan, R. Sudarsanam, R. Govardhanam, G. Govindarajulu Naidu, S. Dakshinamurthi, Ghantasala, V. Nagayya, Pendyala Nageshwara Rao, P. Adinarayana Rao, T. Chalapathi Rao, S. Rajeswara Rao, Master Venu, T. V. Raju, B. Gopalam, G. K. Venkatesh, Vijaya Bhaskar, T. G. Lingappa, Ogirala Ramachandra Rao, H. R. Padmanabha Sastri, V. Dakshinamoorthy, B. A. Chidambaranath, M. S. Baburaj, L.P.R. Varma, G. Devarajan, K. Raghavan, P. S. Divakar and Br Lakshmanan.

Playback singers she sang with
She sang memorable duets mostly with Seerkazhi Govindarajan and T. M. Soundararajan. Others are A. M. Rajah, K. V. Mahadevan, T. A. Mothi, Ghantasala, Thiruchi Loganathan, C. S. Jayaraman, T. R. Mahalingam, K. R. Ramasamy, T. R. Ramachandran, J. P. Chandrababu, S. C. Krishnan, A. L. Raghavan, G. K. Venkatesh, P. B. Sreenivas, V. N. Sundharam, Mehboob, Kamukara Purushothaman, K. P. Udhayabhanu, K. J. Yesudas, P. Jayachandran, Thankappan, M. Sathyam and Pithapuram Nageswara Rao.

She also sang duets with female singers with most notably with P. Leela and K. Jamuna Rani. Others are M. L. Vasanthakumari, N. L. Ganasaraswathi, T. V. Rathnam, K. Rani, P. Bhanumathi, S. Varalakshmi, R. Balasaraswathi Devi, Jikki, P. Suseela, A. G. Rathnamala, S. Janaki, Santha P. Nair, P. Madhuri, K. V. Janaki, T. M. Sarojini, B. Vasantha, Renuka, P. A. Periyanayaki, Vaidehi, Sathyavathi, R. Maragadham and G. Ponnamma.

Filmography
These are some of the films where she was the playback singer.

Hit songs
 Chandanapallakkil Veedukaanaan vanna
 Velukkumbo kulikkuvan Kuttikkuppayam
 Sarkkara Panthalil Thenmazha Choriyum (Recorded by Komala, but KPAC Sulochana sang it in theatres)

References

External links 
 HISTORY OF MY GURUJI KALAIMAMANI A.P.KOMALA

1934 births
Living people
Indian women playback singers
Tamil playback singers
Malayalam playback singers
Telugu playback singers
Kannada playback singers
20th-century Indian singers
20th-century Indian women singers